VPNLab was a VPN service that catered to cyber criminals. The service was shut down by following a seizure Europol in January 2022.

History

VPNLab was created in 2008. The service advertised VPN servers in multiple countries and offered double encryption. The service was known for providing services to cyber criminals, specifically ransomware authors. The site accepted a variety of payments, including WebMoney and Bitcoin. The "DoubleVPN" service was offered at $129 dollars a year. The owners advertised the website on the dark web.

Raid and shutdown

On January 17, 2022, Europol, along with other national law enforcement agencies seized VPNLab's domain. As of January 19, 2022, no arrests were made. Along with Europol, the FBI (United States), Central Directorate of the Judicial Police (France), and National Crime Agency (United Kingdom) were involved in the site raid.

References

Security companies
Defunct websites
Internet services shut down by a legal challenge
Virtual private network services
Internet properties established in 2008